This is a list of distinguished people affiliated with the University of Alberta.

Current faculty

Past faculty

Alumni

Academics

Authors

Judges

Politicians

Other notable alumni

Rhodes Scholars
The University of Alberta has produced 76 Rhodes Scholars, including the following:
 Roland Michener (1919) - 20th governor general of Canada
 George Stanley (1929) - designer of the Canadian flag
 Arthur Kroeger (1956) - academic, federal deputy minister and chancellor of Carleton University

Honorary degree recipients

References

Lists of Canadian people by school affiliation
Lists of people from Alberta